Forgotten Women may refer to:

 The Isle of Forgotten Women, a 1927 American silent drama film, released as Forgotten Women in the UK
 The Forgotten Woman (1921 film), a 1921 American melodrama film directed by Park Frame
 Forgotten Women (1931 film), a 1931 film written by Adele Buffington
 Forgotten Women (1949 film), a 1949 American drama film